Acarozumia nigroflava is a species of wasp in the family Vespidae. It was described by Borsato and Giordani Soika in 1995.

References

Potter wasps
Insects described in 1995